Maria Alexandra Florea (born 11 January 1996), known professionally as Holy Molly, is a Romanian singer, songwriter and musician. She started her career in 2010 as Miss Mary, and in 2019 she reinvented herself and became Holy Molly.

Life and career

1996–2007: Childhood years. The first musical activities
Maria Alexandra Florea was born on 11 January 1996 in Bucharest, Romania. She started singing as a child, under the guidance of her mother, who wanted to become a singer. 
In 1999 she started singing in the Allegretto Children Choir from Bucharest. At the age of seven, she meets her first singing teacher and begins to attend music competitions all over the country. She then attends the Gymnasium School of Arts no. 4 in Bucharest for piano and guitar classes.

2008-2018: «Miss Mary» Period
At twelve years old, she meets Mihai Căciulă, who will become her manager. She goes to a studio for the first time and records in 2010 “You Don’t Love Me” under the alias of Miss Mary. Shortly, she signs with a local record label called Red Clover and releases her first music video for “Open”. In 2016 she starts writing songs and becomes an independent artist.
In 2017 she releases “Shadows”, her first international song with “It's Different”, immediately followed by “Outlaw”. During this period, she graduated from Caragiale National University of Theatre and Film in Bucharest, an acting speciality.

2019-2021: «Holy Molly» Period
In 2019, after one year of failed attempts to work with people and create music, she released “Everybody’s Scared”, her first single as Holy Molly. Her next song "Ménage À Trois" was a collaboration with the German producer Lizot. On August 6, 2021, Holy Molly released a collaboration with the French-Italian duo Shanguy called “C’est La Vie.”

Discography

Singles

As lead artist

Promotional singles

References

External links 

 GlobalRecords.com - Official website
 Holy Molly Channel on YouTube

1996 births
Romanian singer-songwriters
English-language singers from Romania
Romanian women pop singers
Musicians from Bucharest
Living people
Eurodance musicians
People from Bucharest
Romanian dance musicians
Romanian women singers
Global Records artists
21st-century Romanian singers
21st-century Romanian musicians
Romanian songwriters